Ahmadabad-e Sofla may refer to:
 Ahmadabad-e Sofla, East Azerbaijan
 Ahmadabad-e Sofla, Heris, East Azerbaijan Province
 Ahmadabad-e Sofla, Hamadan
 Ahmadabad-e Sofla, Kermanshah
 Ahmadabad-e Sofla, West Azerbaijan

See also
 Ahmadabad-e Pain (disambiguation)